The 2002 UAB Blazers football team represented the University of Alabama at Birmingham (UAB) in the college football season of 2002, and was the twelfth team fielded by the school. The Blazers' head coach was Watson Brown, who entered his eighth season as UAB's head coach. They played their home games at Legion Field in Birmingham, Alabama, and competed as a member of Conference USA. The Blazers finished their seventh season at the I-A level, and fourth affiliated with a conference with a record of 5–7 (4–4 C-USA).

Schedule

Roster

References

UAB
UAB Blazers football seasons
UAB Blazers football